Orthophytum compactum is a plant species in the genus Orthophytum.

The bromeliad is endemic to the Atlantic Forest biome (Mata Atlantica Brasileira) within Minas Gerais state, located in southeastern Brazil.

References

compactum
Endemic flora of Brazil
Flora of Minas Gerais
Flora of the Atlantic Forest